Senator Noble may refer to:

George Bernard Noble (1892–1972), Oregon State Senate
James H. Noble (1851–1912), Wisconsin State Senate
James Noble (senator) (1785–1831), U.S. Senator from Indiana
Larry Noble (fl. 2000s–2010s), Iowa State Senate
Patrick Noble (1787–1840), 57th Governor of South Carolina